Al Aqah is located in the Emirate of Fujairah in the United Arab Emirates. The people of Al Aqah were famous for their many skills, the most important of which were sea-riding, fishing and honey collection from the mountains in addition to agriculture and livestock. The Al Aqah area is one of the most important tourist attractions, the most important of which are Al Aqah Marine Reserve and the Meridian Al Aqah Beach Resort and Hotel. Al Aqah is called "the pearl of the east coast" because of its many stunning scenery and beautiful nature, and also its traditional market.

References 

Populated places in the Emirate of Fujairah